Gad Gasatura is a Ugandan airline transport pilot, transport management expert and former politician, who served as the Chairperson of Uganda National Airlines Company, Uganda's national airline carrier, from 2018 until 2019.

Background and education
Gasatura was born in Ntungamo District, in the Western Region of Uganda. He attended Kings College Budo for his high school education, in the early 1970s. He is a trained, qualified professional airline pilot. He also has a Master of Science degree in Transport Management, awarded by City University of London.

Career
Gasatura was a member of the Constituent Assembly, which promulgated the 1995 Ugandan Constitution. He is remembered for threatening to secede if Banyarwanda were not recognized as a Ugandan ethnic group. Later, he served as an Assistant Superintendent of Police in the Uganda Police Force. He has also served as a pilot for the Christian organisation Mission Aviation Fellowship.

Other responsibilities
Gad Gasatura has served on the Board of Directors at Barclays Bank of Uganda, Diamond Trust Bank (Uganda) and at the Civil Aviation Authority of Uganda.

In 2005, Captain Gasatura was named to head a team of investigators to probe the crash of an Antonov An-12, registered in the Democratic Republic of the Congo as 9Q-CIH, which crashed, soon after takeoff from Entebbe International Airport, on Saturday, 8 January 2005, killing all six crew. The cause of the crash was determined to be due to "engine failure and overloading".

See also
 Transport in Uganda
 List of airports in Uganda

References

External links
 Website of Uganda National Airlines Company
 MPs quiz Kasaija, URSB officials on ownership of Uganda airlines As of 29 March 2019.

Living people
Year of birth missing (living people)
Ugandan businesspeople
Ugandan business executives
Ugandan aviators
Members of the Parliament of Uganda
People from Ntungamo District
People from Western Region, Uganda
National Resistance Movement politicians
People educated at King's College Budo